This was the first edition of the tournament.

Purav Raja and Divij Sharan won the title, defeating Jonathan Erlich and Ken Skupski in the final, 7–6(7–4), 7–6(7–3).

Seeds

Draw

Draw

References
 Main Draw

Los Cabos Open - Doubles
2016 D